The 1960–61 Iowa Hawkeyes men's basketball team represented the University of Iowa in intercollegiate basketball during the 1960–61 season. The team was led by head coach Sharm Scheuerman and played their home games at the Iowa Field House. The Hawkeyes finished the season 18–6 and were 10–4 in Big Ten conference games.

Roster

Connie Hawkins was on the freshmen team during the 1960–61 season.

Schedule/results

|-
!colspan=9 style=| Regular Season

Rankings

Awards and honors
Don Nelson – Honorable Mention All-American (AP)

References

Iowa Hawkeyes men's basketball seasons
Iowa
Hawkeyes
Hawkeyes